Escape from New York is the debut studio album by New York hip hop supergroup Beast Coast, released through Beast Coast Media and Columbia Records on May 24, 2019. The group consists of members from Pro Era (including Joey Badass, Kirk Knight, Nyck Caution, CJ Fly, and Powers Pleasant), Flatbush Zombies and The Underachievers. It features the singles "Left Hand" and "Snow in the Stadium". The group embarked on the Escape from New York Tour to promote the album, which started in Seattle on July 23, 2019. The album is titled after the 1981 American science fiction action film Escape from New York

Critical reception

Sheldon Pearce of Pitchfork said "Escape From New York turns its title into a metaphor. Beast Coast attempt to move beyond the boundaries established by the hallowed ground of their home, finding a deeper inspiration in brotherhood." He also wrote "Songs like “Snow in the Stadium” and “Desperado” show that this group is, in fact, capable of producing not just functional but enjoyable rap songs."

Track listing

Charts

References

2019 debut albums